Jerome Byron Allen (born January 28, 1973) is an American former professional basketball player and college head coach. He is the former head coach for the University of Pennsylvania men's basketball team, until resigning after the 2014–15 season. He is currently an assistant coach for the Detroit Pistons of the National Basketball Association (NBA).

Early life

Allen was born in Philadelphia, Pennsylvania on January 28, 1973. His family struggled to make ends meet, and he lived with 18 relatives in a five-bedroom home, sharing a bed with his sister. Some of his family members sold crack cocaine, and his father left his family at age 10. He attended public school in his youth but attended Episcopal Academy for high school. He became one of the top high school basketball players in the country at Episcopal, receiving scholarship offers at 16 schools. He chose to attend Penn to study accounting at the Wharton School; he had planned on being an accountant in his youth.

College playing career

Allen was a four-year starter at Penn alongside future NBA players Matt Maloney and Ira Bowman. Allen and the Quakers were undefeated from his freshman season to his junior season in the Ivy League. The team's 48-game conference winning streak is the best in Ivy League history. He averaged 13.7 points per game in his career for Penn.

Professional playing career

Minnesota Timberwolves

Allen was selected 49th overall (2nd round, pick 20) by the Minnesota Timberwolves in the 1995 NBA Draft. Until Miye Oni was selected in 2019, Allen was the most recent Ivy League player to be drafted to the NBA. He played 41 games for the Timberwolves, averaging 2.6 points per game in 8.8 minutes per game.

Indiana Pacers

Allen signed with the Indiana Pacers for the 1996 NBA season. He played 51 games, averaging about 3 points in 14 minutes per game. He did not finish the season with the Pacers.

Denver Nuggets

Allen signed with the Denver Nuggets and played 25 games to finish the 1996 NBA season.

Europe

Allen also spent time in France, Italy (with Lottomatica Roma, Carpisa Napoli and Snaidero Udine), Greece, Spain and Turkey.

Coaching career

Penn Quakers

In 2009, he became an assistant coach for the University of Pennsylvania's men's basketball team.  On December 14, 2009, Allen was named interim head coach of the Penn men's basketball team after the firing of Glen Miller.  On March 31, 2010, he was announced as the new permanent head coach of the Penn Men's Basketball team. He resigned his position as head coach effective on March 10, 2015.

Boston Celtics

Allen joined the Boston Celtics in 2015 under head coach Brad Stevens. Allen was one of Boston's longer-tenured assistants and was with the team for all but two seasons of the Brad Stevens era.

Detroit Pistons

In summer 2021, Allen announced he was leaving the Celtics' coaching staff to join Dwane Casey in Detroit.

Bribery case and related NCAA sanctions
In October 2018, Allen pleaded guilty of accepting $18,000 for a bribe in 2014 while as the head coach of Penn to help a student get on the recruiting list in order to get accepted to the University of Pennsylvania. He was ordered to pay back $18,000 in addition to a $200,000 fine. He would testify on behalf of the federal government against the man he said had bribed him – Phillip Esformes. During Esformes's trial, Allen testified that he had received about $300,000 in bribes from Esformes, and that the student in question was Esformes's son.

On February 26, 2020, the NCAA announced penalties against Allen and the Penn men's basketball program stemming from the bribes. The program was placed on two years' probation, but did not receive a postseason ban. Allen received a 15-year show-cause penalty from the NCAA, effective until February 20, 2035. It is the longest ever handed down to a (former) head coach. During this period, any school that hires Allen must "show cause" for why it should not be sanctioned for doing so. In an unusual move, if Allen gets a head coaching job after the show-cause expires, he must sit out the first half of the first season of his return. It is very difficult for a head coach to return to the collegiate ranks even after a show-cause expires, since many presidents and athletic directors are extremely reluctant to hire someone with a show-cause on his record. Only four coaches have ever worked in college basketball again after receiving a show-cause.

Head coaching record

References

External links
NBA.com profile
College & NBA stats @ basketball-reference.com
coach|Boston Celtics

1973 births
Living people
African-American basketball coaches
African-American basketball players
American expatriate basketball people in France
American expatriate basketball people in Greece
American expatriate basketball people in Italy
American expatriate basketball people in Spain
American expatriate basketball people in Turkey
American men's basketball coaches
American men's basketball players
American people convicted of bribery
Basket Napoli players
Basketball coaches from Pennsylvania
Basketball players from Philadelphia
Boston Celtics assistant coaches
Competitors at the 1994 Goodwill Games
Denver Nuggets players
Episcopal Academy alumni
Goodwill Games medalists in basketball
Indiana Pacers players
Liga ACB players
Limoges CSP players
Minnesota Timberwolves draft picks
Minnesota Timberwolves players
NCAA sanctions
Pallalcesto Amatori Udine players
Pallacanestro Virtus Roma players
P.A.O.K. BC players
Penn Quakers men's basketball coaches
Penn Quakers men's basketball players
Saski Baskonia players
Shooting guards
Ülker G.S.K. basketball players
Veroli Basket players
21st-century African-American sportspeople
20th-century African-American sportspeople